Darshahi (also Romanized as Dārshāhī) is a village in Dana Rural District, in the Central District of Dana County, Kohgiluyeh and Boyer-Ahmad Province, Iran. At the 2006 census, its population was 841, in 187 families.

References 

Populated places in Dana County